Ines Maričić (born 22 May 1988 in Zagreb) is a Croatian 9 pin bowling player who plays for SKC Victoria 1947 Bamberg and Croatia national team.

References

1988 births
Living people
Sportspeople from Zagreb
Croatian nine-pin bowling players